The 2004–05 All-Ireland Senior Club Hurling Championship was the 35th staging of the All-Ireland Senior Club Hurling Championship, an inter-county knockout competition for Ireland's top championship clubs representing each county.  The championship was won by James Stephens of Kilkenny, who beat Athenry of Galway by 0–19 to 0–14 in the final.

Results

Connacht Senior Club Hurling Championship

Quarter-finals

Semi-final

Final

Leinster Senior Club Hurling Championship

First round

Quarter-final

Semi-finals

Final

Munster Senior Club Hurling Championship

Quarter-finals

Semi-final

Final

Ulster Senior Club Hurling Championship

Semi-finals

Final

All-Ireland Senior Club Hurling Championship

Semi-finals

Final

Statistics

Top scorers

Top scorers overall

Top scorers in a single game

References

2004 in hurling
2005 in hurling
All-Ireland Senior Club Hurling Championship